Adelbert H. Roberts (August 20, 1866 – January 26, 1937) was an American politician who in 1924 became the first African American to serve in the Illinois Senate.

Biography
Roberts was born August 20, 1866, in Decatur, Michigan. He graduated from high school at 17 and became a teacher. He then chose to take Ph.D. coursework at University of Michigan before attending Northwestern University School of Law. In 1895, he married Lula Wiley with whom he would have four children.

In 1918, Roberts was elected to the Illinois House of Representatives as a Republican. After the Chicago race riot of 1919, Governor Frank Orren Lowden's appointed Roberts to the Chicago Commission on Race Relations created in response to the incident. He was appointed to the Illinois Senate in 1924 to fill a vacancy and elected to the Senate in 1926 and 1930. During his tenure, he was a resident of the Douglas community area.

Roberts died January 26, 1937, in Chicago. He was survived by Lula and two of his sons.

In 1984, Senator Margaret Smith and Representative Howard B. Brookins Sr. successfully campaigned to have a statue of Roberts installed in the Capitol rotunda.

References

External links

1866 births
1937 deaths
20th-century American lawyers
20th-century American politicians
African-American state legislators in Illinois
Illinois lawyers
Republican Party Illinois state senators
Republican Party members of the Illinois House of Representatives
Monmouth College alumni
People from Van Buren County, Michigan
Politicians from Chicago
University of Michigan alumni
20th-century African-American politicians
African-American men in politics
Burials in Illinois